Sprenger is a surname. Notable people with the surname include:

Aloys Sprenger, 19th-century Austrian orientalist
Carl Ludwig Sprenger, 19th-century German botanist
Christian Sprenger (born 1985), Australian breaststroke swimmer
Christian Sprenger (handballer) (born 1983), German handball player
Hans Sprenger (born 1948), German footballer
Jakob Sprenger, German politician of the Nazi era
Jacob Sprenger (also Jacob, Jakob, etc.), 15th-century inquisitor-general of the Roman Catholic Church in Germany
Jan Michael Sprenger (born 1982), German chess grandmaster
Nicholas Sprenger (born 1985), Australian competitive swimmer
Paul Sprenger, American attorney
Richard Sprenger, food safety expert
Sherrie Sprenger, American politician
Justin Sprenger, Professional Baseball Player